Anomiopus howdeni is a species of true dung beetle that can be found in Brazil and French Guiana.

References

howdeni
Beetles described in 2006